Jeannie Gayle Pool (born November 6, 1951) is an American composer, musicologist, filmmaker, producer, and lecturer. An expert on and advocate for women in classical and popular music, she founded the International Congress on Women in Music (now International Alliance for Women in Music), has published books and articles, and has had compositions performed internationally.

Early life and education
Pool was born in Paris, Illinois. She studied music in New York City at Hunter College of the City University of New York, where she earned a bachelor's degree in music (1977). At Columbia University, she studied musicology (1977–1980). She received a master's degree from California State University, Northridge (1987), and a PhD from Claremont Graduate University (2002).

Career
After completing her studies, Pool taught music at universities and worked as a radio and music producer. She began composing music for stage productions and youth orchestras, as well as sacred and orchestral works. Her compositions have been performed internationally.

Her restoration and production in 2011 of the original score by John Stepan Zamecnik for the Academy Award-winning film Wings was nominated for the Best Archival Re-recording of an Existing Score by the International Film Music Critics Association (2013).

She is a consultant for film and television music productions on music rights. Through her business Music Legacy Services, she documents and appraises film and TV music archival collections. She was Executive Director of the Society for the Preservation of Film Music (now The Film Music Society) from 1990 to 2002. She was consultant and music archivist for the Paramount Pictures Music Department from 1995 until 2012.

Known for her research on the history of women in jazz, she has written books and articles. Before publication of the biography of jazz saxophonist Peggy Gilbert (1905-2007), she produced a documentary on the artist, narrated by Lily Tomlin, which has been screened throughout the United States.

In addition to authoring the biography of American composer Zenobia Powell Perry (1908–2004), she is the publisher of Perry's music. She also reconstructed and orchestrated Perry's opera Tawawa House about the Underground Railroad; it was performed by Townsend Opera (now Opera Modesto) in 2014. 

An award-winning radio host and producer, Pool was heard weekly on KPFK-fm Pacifica Radio in Los Angeles on her program Music of the Americas, which featured interviews and recordings of contemporary composers and performers (1980–1997). She produces recordings for Cambria Master Recordings, an independent California label that specializes in American music.

Pool is lecturer in Business of Music at Chapman University Hall-Musco Conservatory of Music in Orange, California (2020—). She has also taught as adjunct faculty at several universities, including California State University, Northridge, Fullerton College, and Mount St. Mary's College (now Mount St. Mary's University).

In 1979, she founded the International Congress on Women in Music. She helped to found and serves as advisor to the Board of the International Alliance for Women in Music. In 2004, she was elected to the Board of the American Society of Music Arrangers and Composers. Currently, she is President of the Los Angeles chapter of the National Association of Composers/USA.

Works

Compositions
Pool has composed for film and stage productions, as well as choir, solo piano, chamber ensemble, and orchestra. Selected works include:
 Secret Life of Paper Cranes, for string orchestra (2001—03)
 Theme and Variations in Seven/Four, for solo piano (2019)
 Cheshire Street Trio, for flute, clarinet, and piano (2018)
 I'm Troubled in Mind, for woodwind quintet (2015)
 Girls in the Band, for wind syphony (2014)
 A Dream, orchestra score for Mary Pickford silent fillm (2011)
 Cheating Husband Rag, for solo piano (2011)
 Angel's Flight, for flute, clarinet, and orchestra (2009)
 New Beginnings Overture, for orchestra (2007)
 Latin Passions, for solo piano (2005)
 Cinematic Suite, for string orchestra (2005)
 Anomaly Trio, for clarinet, cello, and piano (2003)
 Character Matters, for string quartet (2003)
 Character Matters, for solo piano (2003)
 Fantasia for Anne Boleyn, for solo piano (2002)
 Four Seasons," for clarinet and piano (2001–02)
 Episodia II, for chamber orchestra (2000)
 Cantata: We Believe in You, O God, based on the State of Faith, United Church of Christ, for soloists, choir, chamber orchestra, organ, and bagpipes
 Episodia I, for flute, clarinet, and bassoon (1996)
 With Pleasure, for viola and cello (1996)
A Woman of Independent Means, for narrator, bassoon, and recorded tape (1983)

Books

Radio Programs 
 A women's music festival on WBAI (airchecks and production)
 Sojourn Shelter for Battered Women
 Women composers: Janice Giteck and Gloria Coates
 Women composers: interview with Ora Williams and Virginia Eskin

Honors and awards

 Best Archival Re-recording of an Existing Score nomination from the International Film Music Critics Association (2012)
 Appreciation Award from the International Alliance for Women in Music (1999)
 Award from the International Alliance for Women in Music for work on behalf of women musicians (1995)
 Award from National Association of Composers/USA for promotion of American composers (1995)
 Service Award from International Congress on Women in Music at the New York City Congress, (1990)
 Award from National Federation of Music Clubs for promotion of American music (1979)
 Service Award from the California Federation of Music Clubs (1989)
 Award from Local 47 of the American Federation of Musicians for documenting the history of women in music (1986)
 Honorary member Phi Kappa Phi Honor Society, California State University, Northridge Chapter (1986)
 Honorary Arts Member of Sigma Alpha Iota International Music Fraternity (1982)
 Award from USC Thornton School of Music for work on behalf of women in music (1982)
 Radio awards from Sigma Alpha Iota for outstanding broadcasting of American music (1982, 1983, 1986, 1987, 1988)

References

External links

1951 births
Living people
20th-century classical composers
American music educators
American women music educators
American women classical composers
American classical composers
People from Paris, Illinois
Hunter College alumni
California State University, Northridge alumni
Claremont Graduate University alumni
20th-century American women musicians
20th-century American composers
Educators from Illinois
Classical musicians from Illinois
20th-century women composers
20th-century American women writers
21st-century American women writers
20th-century American musicologists
21st-century American musicologists
American women musicologists